The third season of the long-running Australian medical drama All Saints began airing on Seven Network on 8 February 2000 and concluded on 21 November 2000 with a total of 41 episodes.

Cast

Main 
 Georgie Parker as Terri Sullivan
 Jeremy Cumpston as Connor Costello (40 episodes)
 Martin Lynes as Luke Forlano
 Judith McGrath as Von Ryan
 Libby Tanner as Bronwyn Craig
 Ben Tari as Jared Levine
 Erik Thomson as Mitch Stevens (40 episodes)
 Brian Vriends as Ben Markham (37 episodes)
 Kirrily White as Stephanie Markham (episodes 1–23)

Recurring 
 Ling-Hsueh Tang as Kylie Preece (24 episodes)
 Joy Smithers as Rose Stevens (19 episodes)
 Celia Ireland as Regina Butcher (14 episodes)
 Jake Blundell as Tony Hurst (10 episodes)
 Belinda Emmett as Jodi Horner (8 episodes)
 Pia Miranda as Brittany Finlay (6 episodes)

Guest 
 Rachel Gordon as Claudia MacKenzie (5 episodes)
 Marta Dusseldorp as Insp. Debbie Bloom (4 episodes)
 Melissa Jaffer as Eileen Sullivan (4 episodes)
 James Roden as Dr. Stan Ridgeway (4 episodes)
 Anthony Lawrence as Fergus Tiegan (3 episodes)
 Martin Vaughan as Ryan Sullivan (2 episodes)
 Eric Bana as Rob Biletsky (2 episodes)
 Caitlin McDougall as Jodie Reeves (2 episodes)
 Josephine Byrnes as Marion Lord (2 episodes)
 Bille Brown as Steve Coulter (2 episodes) 
 Sarah Aubrey as Amanda Morton (2 episodes)
 Zoe Carides as Sarah Adams (2 episodes)
 Peter Lamb as Neil Phillips (1 episode)
 Christopher Pitman as Rick Forlano (1 episode)
 Julie Hamilton as Maureen Forlano (1 episode)
 Carmen Duncan as Elizabeth Wallace (1 episode)
 Alex Hamill as Christopher Wallace (1 episode)
 Julie Stevenson as Victoria Carlton (1 episode)
 Bob Brooks as Mark Carlton (1 episode)

Notes

Episodes

DVD release

References

External links 
 
 List of All Saints season 3 episodes at the Australian Television Information Archive

All Saints (TV series) seasons
2000 Australian television seasons